Jingyuan may refer to:

Jingyuan County, Gansu
Jingyuan County, Ningxia
Jingyuan mutiny, 783 AD mutiny in Jingyuan during the Tang dynasty
Chinese cruiser Jingyuan (1886), protected cruiser in the late Qing Dynasty Beiyang Fleet
Chinese cruiser Jingyuan (1887), armored cruiser in the late Qing Dynasty Beiyang Fleet